The Grammy Award for Best R&B Song (sometimes known as the R&B Songwriter's Award) has been awarded since 1969. From 1969 to 2000, it was known as the Grammy Award for Best Rhythm and Blues Song. Beyoncé has won it a record five times, while Babyface, Stevie Wonder, Bill Withers and Alicia Keys have three wins each.

The award goes to the songwriter. If the winning song contains samples or interpolations of songs, the original songwriter and publisher can apply for a Winners Certificate. The performing artist does not receive an award unless they are also credited as a songwriter. 

Years reflect the year in which the Grammy Awards were presented, for music released in the previous year.

Recipients

An asterisk (*) indicates this recording also won Song of the Year.

 Each year is linked to the article about the Grammy Awards held that year.
 The performing artist is only listed but does not receive the award.

Category facts
Most Wins

Most Nominations

See also

 List of Grammy Award categories
 List of R&B musicians
 Grammy Award for Best R&B Performance

References

General
  Note: User must select the "General" category as the genre under the search feature.
 

Specific

Grammy Awards for rhythm and blues
Song awards
Songwriting awards